The 130th district of the Texas House of Representatives contains parts of Harris County. The current Representative is Tom Oliverson, who was first elected in 2016.

References 

130